

See also
Single-nucleotide polymorphism
Unique-event polymorphism
Human Y-chromosome DNA haplogroups
List of Y-STR markers

External links 
 Sequence information for 218 M series markers published by 2001
 ISOGG Y-DNA SNP Index - 2007
 Karafet et al. (2008) Supplemental Research Data

DNA
Y DNA
Human evolution
Human population genetics
Genetic genealogy
Phylogenetics
Bioinformatics
Evolutionary biology
Molecular genetics